Capuchin can refer to:
Order of Friars Minor Capuchin, an order of Roman Catholic friars
Capuchin Poor Clares, an order of Roman Catholic contemplative religious sisters
Capuchin monkey, primates of the genus Cebus and Sapajus,  named after the friars
Capuchin Crypt, a room located beneath the church of Santa Maria della Concezione dei Cappuccini in Rome, Italy
Old Dutch Capuchine, a breed of fancy pigeon